Blumenort can refer to:

 Blumenort, Manitoba
 Blumenort, Saskatchewan